Ahrens is a German surname, derived from a patronymic of Ahrend or Arent, which is a variant form of the given name Arnold.

Ahrens may refer to:

People
 Angelika Ahrens (born 1972), Austrian journalist and presenter
 Brigitte Ahrens (born 1945), German singer
 Chris Ahrens (disambiguation), several people by this name
 Dave Ahrens (born 1958), American football linebacker
 Eduard Ahrens (1803–1863), Estonian linguist and clergyman
 Edward H. Ahrens (1919–1942), Navy Cross recipient
 Franz Heinrich Ludolf Ahrens (1809–1881), German philologist
 Gaby Ahrens (born 1981), Namibian sport shooter
 Heinrich Ahrens (1808–1874), German philosopher and jurist
 Janette Ahrens (1925–2016), American figure skater
 Joseph Ahrens (1904–1997), German composer and organist
 Kevin Ahrens (born 1989), American baseball player
 Kurt Ahrens Jr. (born 1940), sports car racing and touring car racing driver
 Lou Ahrens, American soccer player
 Louis H. Ahrens, (born 1918) South African geochemist
 Lynn Ahrens (born 1948), American musical theatre lyricist
 M. Joseph Ahrens, American entrepreneur
 Marlene Ahrens (born 1933), Chilean athlete
 Mary A. Ahrens, American social reformer
 Matthias Ahrens (born 1961), German biathlete, cross-country skier and current coach
 Nick Ahrens (born 1983), American designer and art director
 Rene Ahrens, Australian Paralympic athlete and wheelchair basketballer
 Robert Ahrens (born 1970), American film and theatrical producer
 Sieglinde Ahrens (born 1936), German organist
 Silvia Poll Ahrens (born 1970), Nicaraguan-born swimmer
 Thomas Ahrens (born 1948), German coxswain
 Thomas J. Ahrens (1936–2010), American professor of geophysics
 Tobias Ahrens (born 1993), German footballer
 Tom Ahrens, American nurse
 Walther Ahrens (1910–1981), German microbiologist and hygienist
 Wilhelm Ahrens (mathematician) (1872–1927), German mathematician and writer

Other
 USS Ahrens (DE-575), a Buckley class destroyer escort
 Ahrens (manufacturer), former aircraft manufacturer
 Ahrens v. Clark, a United States Supreme Court case

See also
 Ahrén
 Arens

German-language surnames